Dasht-e Abbas Rural District is a rural district (dehestan) in Musian District, Dehloran County, Ilam Province, Iran. At the 2006 census, its population was 8,525, in 1,335 families.  The rural district has 24 villages.

References 

Rural Districts of Ilam Province
Dehloran County